Rutgers Scarlet Knights baseball is the varsity intercollegiate team representing Rutgers University in the sport of college baseball at the Division I level of the National Collegiate Athletic Association (NCAA).  The team plays its home games at Bainton Field on campus in Piscataway, New Jersey.  The Scarlet Knights are members of the Big Ten Conference, which they joined prior to the 2014 season.

History
The program's first year of competition was 1870. For their first 37 seasons, the program competed without a head coach, compiling a record of 102-157-1.

Fred Hill era (1984–2014)
The 2007 baseball squad tied the school record for victories with 42 and tallied numbers of 63 home runs and 425 RBIs, good enough for second-most in school history. The team finished in first place in the Big East in the regular season, and won the 2007 Big East Conference baseball tournament A record high 6 players would be selected in the 2007 Major League Baseball draft. The home runs record would go on to be broken in the 2010 season.

Joe Litterio era (2014–2019)
Under head coach Joe Litterio, Rutgers Baseball made the transition from the American Athletic Conference to the Big Ten Conference.

Steve Owens era (2020-present)
On May 28, 2019, Joe Litterio's contract was not renewed. On June 26 2019, Steve Owens was announced as the new head coach of the Rutgers program.

Stadium
Rutgers plays at Bainton Field, a 1,500 seat facility located on the campus of Rutgers University in Piscataway, New Jersey.

Head Coaches

Records are through the end of the 2021 season

Taken from the Rutgers Baseball 2021 Fact Book

Major League Baseball
, at least 25 former Scarlet Knights, including Todd Frazier, Eric Young and David DeJesus, have played in Major League Baseball and 72 players have been selected from the school in the Major League Baseball draft.

References